Dichantharellus is a genus of fungi in the Lachnocladiaceae family. The genus contains two species, which are found in Malaysia.

References

External links

Russulales
Russulales genera